Mutnaya is a rural locality (a settlement) in Dobryansky District, Perm Krai, Russia. The population was 51 as of 2010. There are 8 streets.

Geography 
Mutnaya is located 63 km southeast of Dobryanka (the district's administrative centre) by road. Talaya is the nearest rural locality.

References 

Rural localities in Dobryansky District